The 2022–23 Greek Basketball Cup was the 48th edition of Greek top-tier level professional domestic basketball cup competition. The previous winner of the cup was Olympiacos. The cup competition started on 21 September 2022 and ended on 19 February 2023. Olympiacos won the competition.

Format
The top seven placed teams from the top-tier level Greek Basket League's 2022–23 season, gained an automatic bye to the 2022–23 Greek Cup Final 8. While the remaining teams from the 2022–23 Greek Basket League season were eliminated from the 2022–23 Greek Cup tournament. 

The eighth and last 2022–23 Greek Cup team was the winner of the Greek UNICEF National Categories Cup, that was contested between the teams from the Greek 2nd Division Elite League, the Greek 3rd Division B League, and the Greek 4th Division C League.

Qualification tournament

Final 8

Awards

Finals Most Valuable Player

Finals Top Scorer

References

External links
 Official Hellenic Basketball Federation Site 
 Official Greek Basket League Site 

Greek Basketball Cup
2022–23 in European basketball